Çandarlı Castle, is the castle in the Çandarlı District of the Dikili district of İzmir. The exact year it was built is unknown, and it was restored by the Genoese in the 14th century. It was rebuilt in the 15th century by order of Grand Vizier Çandarlı Halil Pasha. The last restoration work started in 2009 was completed in 2014. UNESCO added the castle to the World Heritage Tentative List in 2013.

References 

Tourist attractions in İzmir
Castles in Turkey
Dikili District